Robert J. Blumenfield (born September 13, 1967) is an American elected official in Southern California. Blumenfield is the Los Angeles City Councilmember for the 3rd Council District which encompasses the southwestern San Fernando Valley neighborhoods of Los Angeles, including Canoga Park, Reseda, Tarzana, Winnetka, and Woodland Hills. Blumenfield took office on July 1, 2013. Blumenfield previously represented the 45th district in the California State Assembly, which also covers the southwestern San Fernando Valley.

Early life and education
Blumenfield was born on September 13, 1967. He is a graduate of Duke University and the UCLA Anderson School of Management.

From 1989 to 1996, he worked in Washington, D.C., as a staff person to Senator Bill Bradley, Congressman Howard Berman and as staff designee to the House Budget Committee. He later worked as Director of Government Affairs for the Santa Monica Mountains Conservancy and then as District Chief of Staff to Congressman Berman in the San Fernando Valley.

Political career

California State Assembly 
Blumenfield took office as a member the California State Assembly in 2008 after defeating Republican candidate Armineh Chelebian in the general election. During his time in the Assembly, Blumenfield represented the San Fernando Valley in District 40 and, following redistricting in 2012, District 45. He served as the chair of the Budget Committee.

Los Angeles City Council 
Blumenfield was elected to the Los Angeles City Council in March, 2013. He represents the 3rd Council District, which spans the northwest portion of Los Angeles in the San Fernando Valley, including the communities of Canoga Park, Reseda, Tarzana, Winnetka and Woodland Hills.

Personal life
Blumenfield currently lives in Woodland Hills with his wife Kafi and their two children.

References

External links 
 Council website
 Official Facebook Page
 Official Twitter

Los Angeles City Council members
Democratic Party members of the California State Assembly
Jewish American people in California politics
Legislative staff
1967 births
Living people
Duke University alumni
UCLA Anderson School of Management alumni
Politicians from Brooklyn
People from Woodland Hills, Los Angeles
21st-century American politicians
21st-century American Jews